Way Out may refer to:

 "Way Out" (360 song), featuring Teischa, 2017
 "Way Out" (Jack Harlow song), 2020
 "Way Out" (Roxette song), 2011
 "Way Out" (The La's song), 1987
 Way Out (film), a 1967 film directed by Irvin Yeaworth
 'Way Out, a 1961 fantasy and science fiction television anthology series hosted by writer Roald Dahl
 Way Out!, a 1958 album by Johnny Griffin
 "Way Out", a 2022 song by Dear Seattle
 Wayout, a 1982 3D video game

See also
 
 
 Exit (disambiguation)